Šonov is a municipality and village in Náchod District in the Hradec Králové Region of the Czech Republic. It has about 300 inhabitants. It is located on the border with Poland.

Transport
There is the road border crossing with Poland Šonov / Tłumaczów.

References

Villages in Náchod District